Nolbert Kunonga (born 31 December 1950, in Southern Rhodesia) is the former Zimbabwean Anglican Bishop of Harare and Mashonaland.

Bio
Kunonga was criticised within and outside the Anglican Communion for his ardent support of Robert Mugabe, the President of Zimbabwe. This was at a time when other religious leaders in the country, notably the Roman Catholic archbishop, Pius Ncube, were condemning Mugabe's government for its human rights excesses across Zimbabwe.

Kunonga has been in and out of ecclesiastical courts since 2005. In 2008 he was officially excommunicated, stripping him of all recognition as a cleric within the global Anglican Communion. He has nevertheless continued as the head of a breakaway faction within Zimbabwe, apparently under the protection of President Mugabe, despite the defection of most of his flock and criticism from international church leaders.

A judge ordered in January 2008 that the breakaway Anglican province led by Kunonga must share the use of church buildings with the Anglican Church of the Province of Central Africa loyal to Bishop Sebastian Bakare.

In August 2011, the country's Chief Justice ruled that all Anglican property in the Harare diocese was under Kunonga's custody.

On 19 November 2012, the Zimbabwe Supreme Court Deputy Chief Justice, Luke Malaba, ruled that Kunonga and his followers were no longer part of the Church of the Province of Central Africa and that Kunonga will have to surrender everything that belongs to the church that is in his hands. He was also ordered to pay the costs of the civil appeal.

On 17 March 2017, Kunonga was ordered to pay $427,000 for shares Kunonga sold, when the Zimbabwean Supreme Court upheld a ruling that the shares belonged to Church of the Province of Central Africa.

References

1950 births
Living people
20th-century Anglican bishops in Africa
21st-century Anglican bishops in Africa
Anglican bishops of Harare and Mashonaland
Zimbabwean Anglicans